Hong Kong 08 was a Hong Kong football club which competed in the Hong Kong football league system between 2002 and 2007. It was established to train young talents for the 2008 Olympics, thus was named as "Hong Kong 08".

External links
 Hong Kong Football

Defunct football clubs in Hong Kong
Association football clubs established in 2002
Association football clubs disestablished in 2007
Football clubs in Hong Kong
2002 establishments in Hong Kong
2007 disestablishments in Hong Kong